The 2016–17 Notre Dame Fighting Irish women's basketball team represented the University of Notre Dame during the 2016–17 NCAA Division I women's basketball season. The Fighting Irish, led by thirtieth year head coach Muffet McGraw, play their home games at Edmund P. Joyce Center and were fourth year members of the Atlantic Coast Conference. They finished the season with 33–4, 15–1 in ACC play to win both of the ACC Regular Season and Tournament for the fourth year in a row. They earned an automatic bid to the NCAA women's tournament where they defeated Robert Morris and Purdue in the first and second rounds, respectively. The Irish women defeated Ohio State in the sweet sixteen before losing in a rematch of last year's sweet sixteen to Stanford in the elite eight.

Roster

Media
All Notre Dame games will air on WHPZ Pulse 96.9 FM. Games are streamed online live.

Rankings

Schedule

|-
!colspan=9 style="background:#002649; color:white;"|Exhibition

|-
!colspan=9 style="background:#002649; color:white;"| Regular season

|-
!colspan=9 style="background:#002649; color:white;"| ACC Women's Tournament

|-
!colspan=9 style="background:#002649; color:white;"| NCAA Women's Tournament

Source

Notes

References

Notre Dame Fighting Irish women's basketball seasons
Notre Dame
Notre Dame
Notre Dame Fighting Irish
Notre Dame Fighting Irish